Gossypium thurberi, also known as Arizona wild cotton, Thurber's cotton, or desert cotton, is a wild species of cotton.

Description
Their flowers are not showy, but the palm-shaped green leaves turn maroon in autumn.

Distribution
It is native to the Sonoran Desert area of northern Mexico and parts of the US state of Arizona. It is a larval food plant for the royal moth (Citheronia splendens sinaloensis).

References

External links
USDA - Gossypium thurberi

thurberi